Kristine Lee Norelius (born December 26, 1956, in Seattle, Washington) is an American former competitive rower and Olympic gold medalist.

Olympian
Norelius qualified for the 1980 U.S. Olympic team, but was unable to compete due to the 1980 Summer Olympics boycott. She did, however, receive one of 461 Congressional Gold Medals created especially for the spurned athletes. Four years later, she was a member of the American women's eights team that won the gold medal at the 1984 Summer Olympics in Los Angeles, California.

Family

Kristine Norelius is the sister of Mark Norelius, who was also a rower and competed at the 1976 Summer Olympics. She is married to Brian Faller and has two children.

References

External links
 
 
 

1956 births
Living people
Rowers from Seattle
American female rowers
Rowers at the 1984 Summer Olympics
Olympic gold medalists for the United States in rowing
Medalists at the 1984 Summer Olympics
World Rowing Championships medalists for the United States
Congressional Gold Medal recipients
21st-century American women